Jia Jia was a female giant panda who resided at Ocean Park Hong Kong. At the time of her death, she was the oldest giant panda in captivity.

Jia Jia was born in the wilderness of Sichuan province and was rescued in Qingchuan County around the age of two. She was housed in Wolong National Nature Reserve before being transferred to Hong Kong in 1999, as a gesture to the territory following the British handover. At the time of her death, she had high blood pressure, arthritis and cataracts.

See also
An An

References

Individual giant pandas
1978 animal births
2016 animal deaths